Thrust is a reaction force described by Newton's Second and Third Laws.

Thrust may also refer to:

 Thrust fault, in geology
 Thrust block, a specialised form of thrust bearing used in ships
 Thrust (particle physics), a quantity that characterizes the collision of high energy particles in a collider.
 Thrust bearing,  particular type of rotary bearing
 ThrustSSC, and Thrust2, the land-speed record breaking cars
 Thrust (video game), a computer game
 Thrust (rapper), a Canadian hip hop artist
 Thrust (science fiction magazine), a 1973–1991 American fanzine
 Thrust (album), a Herbie Hancock fusion album
 Thrust stage, in a theatre, a portion of the stage that extends out from the proscenium into the audience.
 Tongue thrust
 Pelvic thrust

See also

Thruster (disambiguation)